The Golden Raspberry Award for Worst Picture is a prize at the annual Razzies to the worst film of the past year. Over the 39 ceremonies that have taken place, 202 films have been nominated for Worst Picture, with three ties resulting in 42 winners.

Winners and nominees
Following is a list of nominees and recipients of the Worst Picture prize, including each film's distribution company and producer(s).

1980s

1990s

2000s

2010s

2020s

Studios with multiple nominations and awards

External links

Golden Raspberry official website
Razzie Awards page on the Internet Movie Database

References

Golden Raspberry Awards by category
Lists of worsts